Aliabad-e Sofla (also Romanized as ‘Ālīābād-e Soflá) is a village in Hati Rural District, Hati District, Lali County, Khuzestan Province, Iran. At the 2006 census, its population was 125, in 17 families.

References 

Populated places in Lali County